The Hull-Warriner Award is an award bestowed by the Dramatists Guild of America. The award is unique in that it is given by dramatists to dramatists. It is presented annually by the Dramatists Guild Council to an author, or team of authors, in recognition of their work dealing with difficult subjects including political, religious, and social mores of the times.

Awardees

2013 Christopher Durang "Vanya and Sonia and Masha and Spike"
2012 Stephen Karam Sons of the Prophet 
2006: Steven Sater & Duncan Sheik Spring Awakening
2005: Adam Guettel & Craig Lucas The Light In The Piazza
2004: John Patrick Shanley Doubt
2003: Doug Wright I Am My Own Wife
2002: Dael Orlandersmith Yellowman
2001: Tony Kushner Homebody/Kabul
2000: David Auburn Proof
1999: Donald Margulies Dinner With Friends
1998: Margaret Edson Wit
1997: Paula Vogel How I Learned To Drive
1996: August Wilson Seven Guitars
1995: Emily Mann Having Our Say
1994: Edward Albee Three Tall Women
1993: Tony Kushner Angels In America
1992
Larry Kramer The Destiny Of Me
John Leguizamo Spic-O-Rama
Donald Margulies Sight Unseen
1991 Scott McPherson Marvin's Room
1990 John Guare Six Degrees Of Separation
1989 Terrence McNally The Lisbon Traviata
1988 Wendy Wasserstein The Heidi Chronicles
1987 Terrence McNally Frankie & Johnnie In The Claire De Lune
1986 George C. Wolfe The Colored Museum
1985 Christopher Durang The Marriage Of Bette And Boo
1984 David Mamet Glengarry Glen Ross
1983 Marsha Norman 'night mother
1982 Harvey Fierstein Torch Song Trilogy
1981 Shirley Lauro Open Admissions
1980 Martin Sherman Bent
1979 Stephen Sondheim & Hugh Wheeler Sweeney Todd
1978 John Guare Landscape Of The Body
1977 Ronald Ribman Cold Storage
1976 Edward Albee Seascape
1975 Miguel Piñero Short Eyes
1974 Terrence McNally Bad Habits
1973 Joseph A. Walker The River Niger
1972 Philip Hayes Dean The Sty Of The Blind Pig
1971 David Rabe The Basic Training Of Pavlo Hummel & Streamers

References

American theater awards